The Dahab bombings of 24 April 2006 were three bomb attacks on the Egyptian resort city of Dahab, in the Sinai Peninsula. The resort town is popular with Western tourists and Egyptians alike during the holiday season.

At about 19:15 Egypt summer time on 24 April 2006 — a public holiday in celebration of Sham el Nessim (Spring festival) — a series of bombs exploded in tourist areas of Dahab, a resort located on the Gulf of Aqaba coast of the Sinai Peninsula.  One blast occurred in or near the Nelson restaurant, one near the Aladdin café (both being on both sides of the bridge), and one near the Ghazala market. 

These explosions followed other bombings elsewhere in the Sinai Peninsula in previous  years: in Sharm el-Sheikh on 23 July 2005 and in Taba on 6 October 2004.

Casualties

At least 23 people were killed, mostly Egyptians, but including a German, Lebanese, Russian, Swiss, and a Hungarian.  Around 80 people were injured, including tourists from Australia, Denmark, France, Germany, Israel, Lebanon, Palestine, South Korea, United Kingdom and the United States.

Responsibility
The governor of South Sinai reported that the blasts might have been suicide attacks, but later Habib Adly, the interior minister of Egypt said that the devices were nail bombs set off by timers, and Egyptian TV also reported that the bombs were detonated remotely. Later reports suggested that the blasts may indeed have been suicide attacks, set off by Bedouins, as in earlier attacks in the Sinai. According to a report by the International Crisis Group, the Dahab bombings appear to have been targeted at the Mubarak government and stem in part from a "deep resentment" of the local people of the northern Sinai over discrimination in "jobs and housing" by governmental programs.

Egyptian security officials have attributed the attacks to an Islamic terror organisation called Jama'at al-Tawhid wal-Jihad.

See also 
 2005 Sharm el-Sheikh attacks
 2004 Sinai bombings
 List of 2006 human rights incidents in Egypt
 Luxor massacre
 Terrorism in Egypt
 List of Islamist terrorist attacks

References

External links 
 Triple blasts rock Egypt resort - BBC
 Egypt resort blasts kill at least 23 - Al Jazeera
 At least 21 Killed at Egyptian Resort - CBC

Mass murder in 2006
Terrorist incidents in Egypt in 2006
Islamic terrorist incidents in 2006
Improvised explosive device bombings in Egypt
Suicide bombings in Egypt
Terrorist incidents in the Sinai Peninsula
Attacks on tourists
April 2006 events in Asia
Building bombings in Egypt
South Sinai Governorate
Attacks in Egypt in 2006